Leo Apostel (Antwerp, 4 September 1925 – Ghent, 10 August 1995) was a Belgian philosopher and professor at the Vrije Universiteit Brussel and Ghent University. Apostel was an advocate of interdisciplinary research and the bridging of the gap between exact science and humanities.

Biography 
Leo Apostel was born Antwerp, Belgium, in 1925. After the second World War he studied philosophy at the ULB in Brussels with philosopher of law and logician Chaïm Perelman. He got his M.A. at the ULB in Brussels in October 1948 with the thesis Questions sur l'Introspection. For another year he stayed there working as an assistant of Perelman.

In 1950-1951 Apostel was a CRB fellow at the University of Chicago with Rudolf Carnap, and with Carl Hempel at Yale University. He took his Ph.D. at the ULB in March 1953 with the dissertation "La Loi et les Causes". In 1955 he went to Geneva Switzerland to study with Jean Piaget at the Centre International d'Epistémologie Génétique. These experiences would influence him for the rest of his life.

From 1955 Apostel lectured logic and philosophy of science at the Ghent University and the ULB for three years. In 1958-1959 he was visiting professor at the Pennsylvania State University, and from 1960 to 1979 professor at Ghent University.

Leo Apostel was awarded the Solvay award for human sciences in 1985 and the Arkprijs van het Vrije Woord in 1986. The transdisciplinary research department Center Leo Apostel (CLEA) at the Vrije Universiteit Brussel was named after him.

Apostel died at the age of 69 on August 10, 1995.

Work 
Apostel was an advocate of interdisciplinary research and the bridging of the gap between exact science and humanities.

He wrote two books about Freemasonry: Freemasonry: A Philosophical Essay in 1985, and Atheïstische spiritualiteit in 1998.

His ideas about atheistic religiosity are widely acknowledged.

Origins 
In his book "Oorsprong" (Origin) from 2000 Apostel gives a metaphysical introduction about the beginning of man, life and the universe. This work is part of his project to develop his own scientific metaphysics. The basis for this is the contemporary philosophy of science and humanities and the existing sciences from physics, astrophysics, biology, geology to anthropology. In this book he first outlines the term metaphysics, then presents an ontology, which results in his own consistent world view.

Literature 
Apostel wrote about 20 books and 100 articles in Dutch, French and English. Some of his books:

 Matière et Forme
 Communication et Action 
 Logique et Dialectique 
 African Philosophy : myth or reality? 
 Afbraak en Opbouw
 De Gebroken Orde
 Waarde en Zin van de Cultuurwetenschappen in de 20e eeuw 
 1982, "Mysticism, ritual and atheism", in Religious atheism?, Belgium
 1985, Freemasonry: A Philosophical Essay
 1998, Atheïstische spiritualiteit

About Leo Apostel 
 Ingrid Van Dooren and Leo Apostel, The Philosophy of Leo Apostel: A life history Communication and Cognition, 1989.

See also 
 Center Leo Apostel for Interdisciplinary Studies
 World view

References

External links
 Leo Apostel Official website, Ghent University.

1925 births
1995 deaths
Writers from Antwerp
20th-century Belgian philosophers
Flemish philosophers
Free University of Brussels (1834–1969) alumni
Belgian systems scientists
Academic staff of Ghent University
Ark Prize of the Free Word winners
Belgian atheists